Mount Tidar (Gunung Tidar in Indonesian) is a small hill in the vicinity of Magelang, Central Java, Indonesia. It is located in the south of Magelang, on the beginning of 40 km road to Yogyakarta. On the other side of the hill, there is a golf course.

A Javanese legend said that the hill is the point where the Island of Java is 'nailed' to the earth, and has been known as the Nail of Java. It is said that the gods placed the nail to prevent the Java island from tremor and sinking.

On the historic Kedu Plain and not far north from Borobudur this hill is believed to have significance and power in the network of Javanese sacred places. Although different in character and associations it can be compared to the hill on the  southern slope of Mount Merapi – Turgo within the network of sacred places.

Mount Tidar hosts the Akademi Militer (Military Academy) that trains future army personnel.

External links 
 Website resmi Pemerintah Kota Magelang/Official Website of the Government of the City of Magelang 

Tidar
Magelang
Hills of Indonesia